Scharnebeck is a Samtgemeinde ("collective municipality") in the district of Lüneburg, in Lower Saxony, Germany. Its seat is in the village Scharnebeck.

Division of the municipality
The Samtgemeinde Scharnebeck consists of the following municipalities:
 Artlenburg
 Brietlingen
 Echem
 Hittbergen
 Hohnstorf
 Lüdersburg
 Rullstorf
 Scharnebeck

References

Samtgemeinden in Lower Saxony
Lüneburg (district)